The National Trades' Union was the first federation of labor unions in the United States. It was established in 1834, but collapsed during the Panic of 1837.

History
Under the federation, by 1836 around fifty unions had formed in Philadelphia, New York, Baltimore, Boston, Albany, Schenectady, Troy, Washington, D.C., Newark and New Brunswick, New Jersey; Cincinnati, Ohio; Pittsburgh, Pennsylvania; Louisville, Kentucky; and elsewhere. While some organized national unions within their crafts, most participated in citywide "trades' unions," which established the short-lived National Trades' Union in 1834 under the presidencies of first Ely Moore then John Commerford. 

The NTU collapsed with most of its constituent bodies during the panic of 1837.

References
A Cox, DC Bok, MW Finkin and RA Gorman, Labor Law: Cases and Materials (2006) 11

United States labor law